Cicely Frances Berry  (17 May 1926 – 15 October 2018) was a British theatre director and vocal coach.

Berry trained under Elsie Fogerty at the Central School of Speech and Drama, then based at the Royal Albert Hall, London.  She was the voice director for the Royal Shakespeare Company from 1969 to 2014, and worked as a voice and text coach as an instructor at London's Central School of Speech and Drama. She conducted workshops all over the globe, including Korea, Russia, and Asia. Her work also extended to prisons, using Shakespeare as a vessel to find confidence in speaking and response to imagery.  One of her earliest teachers was Barbara Bunch. In addition to her voice and text work in the theatre, she also did work in film, including serving as "dialogue coach" on The Last Emperor (1987); "dialogue coach" on Stealing Beauty (1996); and as "voice specialist" on Julie Taymor's 1999 film, Titus.

Books
 Voice and the Actor (1973)
 Your Voice and How to Use It
 The Actor and the Text
 Text in Action
 Word Play: A Textual Handbook for Directors and Actors

Directing
 Hamlet for the National Theatre Education Unit
 King Lear for The Other Place and The Royal Shakespeare Company

Honours

 1985 - Received OBE
 1992 - Nominated for special award by Arts Council for her ‘response to the challenges posed by a technologically diverse and increasingly multi-cultural environment.’
 1997 – Doctor Honoris, National Academy of Film and Theatre Arts, Sofia, Bulgaria
 1999 – Honorary Doctorate of Literature from Birmingham University
 2000 – The Sam Wanamaker Prize for pioneering work in theatre
 2001 – Honorary Doctorate of Literature from the Open University
 2009 - Berry was appointed Commander of the Order of the British Empire (CBE) in the 2009 Birthday Honours.

Footnotes

Bibliography

 Barnett, Laura, Cicely Berry, Voice Coach to the Stars. Guardian
 Berry, Cicely, documentary. Where Words Prevail.  Dir. Steven Budlong and Salvatore Rasa.  Sorjourner Media, L.L.C., 2005.
 Berry, Cicely, Kristin Linklater, and Patsy Rodenburg. "Shakespeare, Feminism, and Voice: Responses to Sarah Werner."  New Theatre Quarterly XIII.49 (1997): 48-52.
 Berry, Cicely.  Voice and the Actor.  New York: Hungry Minds, Inc., 1973.
 https://www.imdb.com/

1926 births
2018 deaths
British voice coaches
British theatre directors
British voice directors
Academics of the Royal Central School of Speech and Drama
Commanders of the Order of the British Empire
Women theatre directors